Mount McArthur is a mountain located in Yoho National Park, British Columbia, Canada. It was named in 1886 by Otto Koltz after James J. McArthur, a land surveyor who mapped the Canadian Rockies for the Canadian Pacific Railway.

Climate

Based on the Köppen climate classification, this mountain is located in a subarctic climate zone with cold, snowy winters, and mild summers. Winter temperatures can drop below −20 °C with wind chill factors below −30 °C.

Geology

The peak is composed of sedimentary rock laid down during the Precambrian to Jurassic periods. Formed in shallow seas, this sedimentary rock was pushed east and over the top of younger rock during the Laramide orogeny.

See also
Geology of British Columbia

References

External links
 Flickr photo: Mount McArthur
 Mount McArthur: weather

Three-thousanders of British Columbia
Mountains of Yoho National Park
Kootenay Land District
Canadian Rockies